Kalaavati (Kannada: ಕಲಾವತಿ) is a 1964 Indian Kannada film, directed by T. V. Singh Thakur and produced by T. Dwarakanath and A. Vasudeva Rao. The film stars Udaykumar, Balakrishna, Narasimharaju and Vijayarao in the lead roles. The film has musical score by G. K. Venkatesh and Lakshman Berlekar.

Cast

Udaykumar
Balakrishna
Narasimharaju
Vijayarao
T. Dwarakanath
Sheshappa
Sridhar
Master Udayashankar
Guggu
Bhaskar
Jayanthi
Adavani Lakshmi
B. Jayashree
Latha

Soundtrack
The music was composed by G. K. Venkatesh.

References

1960s Kannada-language films
Films scored by G. K. Venkatesh